Celia Diemkoudre (born ) is a Dutch female volleyball player. She is part of the Netherlands women's national volleyball team.

She participated in the 2014 FIVB Volleyball World Grand Prix.
On club level she played for Sliedrecht Sport in 2014.

Life
Diemkoudre was born in Niger, as the daughter of Alidou Diemkoudre from Niger and the Dutch aid worker Sylvia Dorland. The family moved to the Netherlands in 2001.

References

External links
 Profile at FIVB.org

1992 births
Living people
Dutch women's volleyball players
Nigerien sportswomen
People from Niamey